"Monsters!" is the first segment of the fifteenth episode from the first season (1985–86) of the television series The Twilight Zone. It stars Ralph Bellamy as an aging vampire who returns to his hometown to spend his final days, and befriends a local boy.

Plot
Toby Michaels and his father are monster fanatics and his room is full of monster movie memorabilia. When a new neighbor moves in to his friend's old house, Toby investigates to see if they have any children, but it is only an elderly bachelor, Emile Bendictson. Bendictson notices Toby's monster interest and reveals that he is a vampire. He assures Toby that most of the lore around vampires is inaccurate, including aversion to daylight, garlic, and crucifixes. Toby tries to tell his parents, but finds he is physically incapable of doing so.

Toby spies on Bendictson, and sees him lift the front end of his car with his bare hands to polish it. Once Toby is assured that Bendictson intends him no harm, the two become friends. Bendictson's vampiric thirst is sated with hospital bags of blood.

Toby gets sick, which his parents think is a case of the flu. Bendictson comes to Toby's window and invites him for a walk. They go to the cemetery and he explains to Toby that after he became undead he had to move constantly, since the presence of vampires incites a genetic mutation in average humans, illustrated by their sneezing whenever he is near. However, he has now returned to the town where he became a vampire to die. He also advises Toby that midnight is when the monsters come out. Before they leave the cemetery, he shows Toby how to enjoy lightning bugs in the cornfield.

All the neighbors in a five block radius have now become ill. At midnight, Toby and his parents mutate into the monsters Bendictson described. Bendictson is killed by a pack of monsters that enter his house. The next morning, Bendictson's battered body is taken away. The neighbors mourn his passing and do not realize that it was they who killed him. That night, Toby takes his dad and shows him the lightning bugs in the field and his dad sneezes.

External links
 

The Twilight Zone (1985 TV series season 1) episodes
1986 American television episodes
Television episodes about vampires

fr:La Nuit des monstres